Mamadou Lamarana Diallo (born 19 September 1994) is a professional footballer who plays as a forward for Portuguse club Vilafranquense. Born in Senegal, he represents the Guinea national team.

Professional career
Diallo was a youth product of Dakar Sacré-Cœur in Senegal, before being spotted and recruited by Sochaux. Diallo made his professional debut with Sochaux in a 1-1 Ligue 1 tie with SC Bastia on 23 November 2013. After his stint at Sochaux, Diallo spent his early career in the amateur divisions of French football. On 7 May 2020, Diallo signed for Grenoble.

International career
Born in Senegal, Diallo is of Guinean descent. On 27 December 2021, the Guinean Football Federation announced that Diallo had decided to represent their national team and was included in Guinea's extended 2021 Africa Cup of Nations squad. He debuted with Guinea in a 1–0 2021 Africa Cup of Nations win over Malawi on 10 January 2022.

References

External links
 
 
 
 

1994 births
People from Dakar Region
Senegalese people of Guinean descent
Living people
Guinean footballers
Guinea international footballers
Senegalese footballers
Association football forwards
FC Sochaux-Montbéliard players
Arras FA players
Iris Club de Croix players
US Créteil-Lusitanos players
Grenoble Foot 38 players
U.D. Vilafranquense players
Ligue 1 players
Ligue 2 players
Championnat National players
Championnat National 2 players
Championnat National 3 players
2021 Africa Cup of Nations players
Guinean expatriate footballers
Senegalese expatriate footballers
Expatriate footballers in France
Guinean expatriate sportspeople in France
Senegalese expatriate sportspeople in France
Expatriate footballers in Portugal
Guinean expatriate sportspeople in Portugal
Senegalese expatriate sportspeople in Portugal